KBYZ (96.5 FM), known as "96.5 The Walleye", is a radio station located in Bismarck, North Dakota, United States, owned by Townsquare Media.

Townsquare Media also owns KLXX 1270 (Talk), KKCT 97.5 (CHR), KACL 98.7 (Classic Hits), and KUSB 103.3 (Country) in the Bismarck-Mandan area. All the studios are at 4303 Memorial Highway in Mandan, along with the AM transmitter and tower. All the FM transmitters are at a site in Saint Anthony, North Dakota, on 57th Road.

History
The station originally debuted in 1984 as "Z-96", and aired a format of adult contemporary music.  The station changed formats to classic rock in the early 1990s, rebranded as "The Fox", and began evolving into the fringe alongside the mainstream rock format with the addition of newer rock in 2006. When Townsquare Media purchased the station from Cumulus Media in 2012, the station evolved into a full-fledged mainstream rock format (while continuing to be billed as a classic rock station) to compete with active rock formatted KSSS, which also began as a classic rock station.

In 2013, the station rebranded itself as "The New Evolution of Classic rock" and began playing more 80's and 90's-based rock. The station also dropped The Bob and Tom Show, opting for Grand Rapids-based Free Beer and Hot Wings, to anchor the station's morning show.

On December 11, 2021, KBYZ dropped its "96.5 The Fox" branding and began stunting as "Go Fish Radio", promoting a format a change at 4 p.m. on December 16.  The radio station revamped their format as "96.5 The Walleye" and returning somewhat to their more recent classic rock mix before Townsquare bought the station. The first song on "The Walleye" was "My Own Worst Enemy" by Lit.

Previous logo

References

External links

 

BYZ
Radio stations established in 1984
1984 establishments in North Dakota
Townsquare Media radio stations
Classic rock radio stations in the United States